Lee Patrick Strobel (born January 25, 1952) is an American Christian author and a former investigative journalist. He has written several books, including four which received ECPA Christian Book Awards (1994, 1999, 2001, 2005) and a series which addresses challenges to the veracity of Christianity. He also hosted a television program called Faith Under Fire on PAX TV and runs a video apologetics web site.

Early life and education
Strobel was born in Arlington Heights, Illinois. He received a journalism degree from University of Missouri and a Master of Studies in Law degree from Yale Law School.

Career
Lee was a journalist for the Chicago Tribune and other newspapers for 14 years. In 1980, the UPI Illinois Editors Association newspaper award program gave him a first place for public service (the Len H. Small Memorial award) for his coverage of the Pinto crash trial involving a class-action lawsuit against the Ford Motor Company in Winamac, Indiana. Strobel later became assistant managing editor of the Daily Herald, before leaving journalism in 1987.

Strobel states he was an atheist when he began investigating the biblical claims about Christ after his wife's conversion. Prompted by the results of his investigation, he became a Christian at the age of 29.

Ministry
Strobel became teaching pastor of Willow Creek Community Church in South Barrington, Illinois, from 1987 to 2000. In 2000, he became pastor at Saddleback Church in Lake Forest. In 2004, he left his post as pastor to host the Christian apologetics show Faith Under Fire.
In 2014, he became a teaching pastor at Woodlands Church in The Woodlands and a professor of Christian thought at Houston Baptist University.

Recognition
In 2007, he was awarded an honorary doctoral degree by Southern Evangelical Seminary in recognition of his contributions to Christian apologetics.

Personal life
Strobel and his wife Leslie have two children and several grandchildren. His daughter Alison is a novelist, and his son Kyle is an Assistant Professor of Spiritual Theology and Formation at the Talbot School of Theology.

Bibliography
 Reckless Homicide? Ford's Pinto Trial (1980) 
 Inside the Mind of Unchurched Harry and Mary (1993) 
 What Jesus Would Say (1994) 
 God's Outrageous Claims (1998) 
 Surviving a Spiritual Mismatch in Marriage (2002) 
 Experiencing the Passion of Jesus (2004), with Garry Poole, Zondervan, 
 Discussing the Da Vinci Code: Exploring the Issues Raised by the Book and Movie (2006) 
 The Unexpected Adventure: Taking Everyday Risks to Talk with People about Jesus (May 29, 2009), Zondervan, 
 The Ambition: A Novel (Fiction Work) (May 14, 2011), Zondervan, 
 Today's Moment of Truth: Devotions to Deepen Your Faith in Christ (July 12, 2016), Zondervan,

"The Case for..." series
 The Case for Christ: A Journalist's Personal Investigation of the Evidence for Jesus (September 1, 1998), Zondervan, 
 The Case for Faith: A Journalist Investigates the Toughest Objections to Christianity (October 1, 2000), Zondervan, 
 The Case for a Creator: A Journalist Investigates Scientific Evidence That Points Toward God (2004), Zondervan, 
 The Case for Easter: Journalist Investigates the Evidence for the Resurrection (2004), Zondervan, 
 The Case for Christmas: A Journalist Investigates the Identity of the Child in the Manger (2005), Zondervan, 
 The Case for the Real Jesus: A Journalist Investigates Current Attacks on the Identity of Christ (September 10, 2007), Zondervan, 
 The Case for Christianity Answer Book (July 1, 2014), Zondervan, 
 The Case for Hope: Looking Ahead with Confidence and Courage (2015), Zondervan, 
 The Case for Grace: A Journalist Explores the Evidence of Transformed Lives (2015), Zondervan, 
 In Defense of Jesus: Investigating Attacks on the Identity of Christ (2016)
 The Case for Miracles: A Journalist Investigates Evidence for the Supernatural (2018)
 The Case for Heaven: A Journalist Investigates Evidence for Life After Death (2021)

Children's apologetics series
 The Case for Faith for Kids (2006), Zonderkidz, 
 The Case for Christ for Kids (2006), Zonderkidz, 
 A Case for a Creator for Kids (2006), Zonderkidz, 
 Off My Case for Kids: 12 Stories to Help You Defend Your Faith (2006), Zonderkidz,

Novels
 The Ambition: A Novel (May 14, 2011), Zondervan,

Film 
Strobel appeared in the 2016 film God's Not Dead 2.

A film titled The Case for Christ, based on Strobel's book, had its theatrical release in April 2017. The film was directed by Jonathan M. Gunn and is about an atheist reporter who tries to prove Christianity to be a cult. The film was produced by Triple Horse Studios and distributed by Pure Flix Entertainment.

References

External links

 Official website

1952 births
Living people
20th-century American journalists
20th-century American male writers
20th-century American non-fiction writers
20th-century Christians
21st-century American male writers
21st-century American non-fiction writers
21st-century Christians
American Christian clergy
American Christian writers
American investigative journalists
American male journalists
Chicago Tribune people
Christian apologists
Converts to Christianity from atheism or agnosticism
Critics of atheism
Harvard Law School alumni
Intelligent design advocates
Journalists from Illinois
People from Arlington Heights, Illinois
People from South Barrington, Illinois
University of Missouri alumni
Writers from Illinois
Yale University alumni